Manila's 6th congressional district is one of the six congressional districts of the Philippines in the city of Manila. It has been represented in the House of Representatives of the Philippines since 1987. The district consists of barangays 587 to 648 and 829 to 905 in the eastern Manila districts of north Paco, Pandacan, San Miguel, Santa Ana and Santa Mesa. It is currently represented in the 19th Congress by Benny Abante of the National Unity Party (NUP) and Asenso Manileño.

This district includes the Malacañang Palace, the official residence of the president of the Philippines.

Representation history

Election results

2022

2019

2016

2013

2010

See also
Legislative districts of Manila

References

Congressional districts of the Philippines
Politics of Manila
1987 establishments in the Philippines
Congressional districts of Metro Manila
Constituencies established in 1987